Long Lake is an unincorporated census-designated place in the town of Long Lake, Florence County, Wisconsin, United States. As of the 2020 census, its population was 59. The community became a census-designated place in 2010. The community has the 54542 ZIP code.

Demographics 

Whites make up the largest racial/ethnic group in Long Lake (100.0%).

Images

References

Census-designated places in Florence County, Wisconsin
Census-designated places in Wisconsin
Iron Mountain micropolitan area